Mina Teicher is an Israeli mathematician at Bar-Ilan University, specializing in algebraic geometry.

Teicher earned bachelor's, masters, and doctoral degrees from Tel Aviv University in 1974, 1976, and 1981 respectively. Her dissertation, Birational Transformation Between 4-folds, was supervised by Ilya Piatetski-Shapiro.
Since 1999, she has directed the Emmy Noether Research Institute for Mathematics at Bar-Ilan University.
In 2001–2002 she was the inaugural Emmy Noether Visiting professor at the University of Göttingen, where she lectured about braid groups.

She has held many leadership roles in academia and science, including serving from 2005 to 2007 as chief scientist at Israel's Ministry of Science and Technology, and chairing the board of governors of the United States – Israel Binational Science Foundation from 2012 to 2013.

References

External links
Home page

Year of birth missing (living people)
Living people
Israeli mathematicians
Women mathematicians
Algebraic geometers
Tel Aviv University alumni
Academic staff of Bar-Ilan University